Erhard Auer (22 December 1874 – 20 March 1945) was a Bavarian politician, member of the state parliament, first Minister of the Interior of the Free State of Bavaria, and leader of the Social Democratic Party (SPD) in Bavaria.

Life and occupation
The illegitimate son of a seamstress from an already social democratic family, Auer was born in Dommelstadl, Neuburg am Inn near Passau. He worked at the age of twelve as a farm labourer. At the age of fifteen, Auer was one of the co-founders of an immediately banned agricultural labor movement. After his military service, he achieved a remarkable social rise. As a messenger, he joined in 1896 in a Munich trading house and reached in the course of time through intensive training a senior position. In 1900 he entered the service of the Ortskrankenkasse München. This position he gave in 1908 due to his numerous political obligations. In the First World War Auer was a soldier.

Party and parliamentary mandates
From 1892 Auer was a member of the Social Democratic Party of Germany. From 1900 to 1921 he was head of the newly established State Secretariat of the Bavarian SPD and was, therefore, a close associate of the chairman Georg von Vollmar. From 1907 Auer was a member of the Bavarian Chamber of Deputies and from 1919 until the end of the Republic Vice-President of the Bavarian State Parliament. In 1919/20 he was a member of the Constituent Weimar National Assembly.

Auer during the revolution of 1918/19
Auer was viewed as the great rival of socialist Kurt Eisner who was shot dead in Munich by a German nationalist on 21 February 1919. Auer was viewed as the best hope to fend off a Bolshevik Revolution. To Auers role during the strike with Krupp in January 1918 Ernst Toller writes in " A youth in Germany"The" leader of the legal socialists "Auer had appeased the workers:" For days the strike lasted until the right-wing socialist parliamentarians took control of the leadership, promising the war minister to strangle the strike, shortly after which the strike collapsed. Before that, a delegation will be elected to "hand over the demands of the strikers to the minister with all seriousness and with all vigor". The leader of the legal socialists Auer appeased the dissatisfied workers by vouching for the fulfillment of their demands, promising that he would lead the delegation to the minister, that no one who participated in the strike would be fired and no one punished. In the morning, the strikers gathered for a final rally on the Theresienwiese, the train moves into the city and dissolves at Karlsplatz.

After the resignation of Georg von Vollmar Auer was elected as his successor. On 8 November 1918, the provisional National Council of Bavaria elected a revolutionary government of MSPD and USPD with Kurt Eisner as Prime Minister and Erhard Auer as Minister of the Interior.

Auer, who also belonged to the Weimar National Assembly, like the majority of the Bavarian MSPD leadership, endeavored to close as soon as possible a coalition with the Bavarian People's Party and the Liberals, as was also done at the federal level with the Weimar coalition.

In the state elections of 12 January 1919, the USPD suffered a crushing defeat and Eisner wanted to declare his resignation as Prime Minister at the inaugural session of the Diet on 21 February 1919 but was shot on the way to the parliament building by Count Anton Graf von Arco auf Valley. It then came to riots in the state parliament, in which Erhard Auer was shot by the left-wing extremist Alois Lindner and the Major Paul Ritter von Jahreiß (Speaker in the Bavarian Ministry of War ) was killed. The conservative MP Heinrich Osel also died of a gunshot wound, but the perpetrators remained unclear in this case.

Weimar Republic and National Socialism 
After his recovery, he was operated on by Ferdinand Sauerbruch, Auer took over the chairmanship of the SPD parliamentary group. From 1919 to 1933 he was city councillor in Munich, from October 1922 to 1933 editor at the Munich Post . In the mid-1920s, Auer campaigned for a reformist orientation of the new SPD policy program (" Heidelberg Program ") (1925). He was one of the Social Democrats who tried to strongly oppose the rise of the fledging Nazis. On 17 March 1922, he spoke at one of Bavaria's Interior Minister Franz Xaver Schweyer convened meeting as the sole party chairman in the state parliament against expulsion of Adolf Hitler to Austria. In response to the Hitler coup in 1923, Auer prompted the formation of social democratic self-protection groups, the so-called Auer-Garden, which were later transferred to the " Reichsbanner Schwarz-Rot-Gold ".

After the "seizure of power" by the NSDAP Auer initially went underground and fled to Innsbruck. A short time later, however, he returned to Munich. On 9 May 1933, he was severely abused by the National Socialists in the Munich City Council and imprisoned in the prison Stadelheim. After his release, Auer was banned from visiting Munich and subsequently forced to change his whereabouts and employment. In connection with the assassination attempt of Hitler on 20 July 1944 Auer, now seriously ill, was again arrested, imprisoned in the Dachau concentration camp and probably relocated to Giengen an der Brenz, Württemberg with an ambulance because of the advancing Allied troops, where he died 20 March 1945.

Honors 
In Munich-Neuhausen, the Erhard-Auer-Straße is named after him.
1929: Honorary citizen of the city of Penzberg for his services to the elevation of Penzberg to the city

References

Informational notes

Citations

Bibliography

 - Total pages: 1008 
 

1874 births
1945 deaths
Politicians from Berlin
Social Democratic Party of Germany politicians
Ministers-President of Bavaria
Members of the Bavarian Chamber of Deputies
Bavarian Soviet Republic
People of the German Revolution of 1918–1919
German people who died in Dachau concentration camp
People from Passau (district)